Katrina "Katie" Monton (born 23 September 1987 in Montreal, Quebec) is a water polo player from Canada.

Personal life
Monton's parents are Luis and Johanne Monton. She has a younger sister Olivia, and an older sister Danielle. She grew up in Dorval, QC, Canada and currently lives in New York, New York.

Professional career
Monton received a BA in Sociology and Psychology at the Concordia University  In 2011, she played at University of California, Berkeley on a full scholarship. While at Cal, she contributed to a second place finish at the Division 1 NCAA Tournament in Ann Arbour Michigan, highest ranking in the schools history. Upon her retirement from the Canadian national team, she received an MA in Counselling at McGill University. Monton is currently enrolled at Columbia University in pursuit of an MA in Social-Organizational Psychology.

Monton has worked with many organizations both locally and globally, including Big Brother Big Sister, Generostiy.org, CHIPS homeless shelter and many more. Due to Monton's generous contributions to her community, she was awarded the Sovereigns Medal by the Governor General of Canada.

Sport career
Monton started playing water polo when she was 13 years old. She was a competitive swimmer first before playing water polo in the summer pool system, where she was recruited by a winter coach to be part of a water polo club. Monton was a member of the Canadian Jr. National water polo team from 2004 to 2007. She was the captain of the Jr. National team from 2005 to 2007. Monton was center forward with the senior women’s national team from 2007 to 2016. Monton helped Canada reach the podium at six major international events.

Athletic Achievements
 Pan American Games: 2015 – 
 NCAA Div 1 Championship Tournament, University of California, Berkeley: 2011 – , (Highest ranking in the history of the school.)
 Pan American Games: 2011 – 
 FINA world championships (junior): 2007 – 10th; 2005 – 6th
 FINA world championships: 2013 – 8th; 2011 – 8th; 2009 – ; 2007 – 6th
 FINA World League: 2014 – 6th; 2013 – 8th; 2012 – 7th; 2011 – 6th; 2010 – 8th; 2009 – ; 2008 – 4th
 Commonwealth Games: 2006 – 
 Pan American Championships (junior): 2006 – ; 2004 – 
 FINA World Cup: 2010 – 5th
 Won nine consecutive National Championships: 2004 to 2013, eleven total in her career

In the Media
https://montreal.ctvnews.ca/mobile/video?playlistId=1.2624592

https://globalnews.ca/video/2879239/live-for-the-cause-2

https://www.youtube.com/watch?v=YHlp-vc0Iyk

See also
 List of World Aquatics Championships medalists in water polo

References
https://www.gg.ca/en/honours/recipients/342-95546

External links
 
 http://waterpolocanadawomen.blogspot.com/2011/04/april-athlete-of-month-katrina-monton.html
 http://canadianathletesnow.ca/athletes/katrina-monton/

1987 births
Canadian female water polo players
Living people
Pan American Games medalists in water polo
Pan American Games silver medalists for Canada
Water polo players from Montreal
Water polo players at the 2011 Pan American Games
Water polo players at the 2015 Pan American Games
Medalists at the 2011 Pan American Games
Medalists at the 2015 Pan American Games
World Aquatics Championships medalists in water polo